George Macpherson-Grant may refer to:

Sir George Macpherson-Grant, 1st Baronet (1781–1846), MP for Sutherland
Sir George Macpherson-Grant, 3rd Baronet (1839–1907)
Sir George Macpherson-Grant, 5th Baronet (1890-1951), of the Macpherson-Grant Baronets

See also
George MacPherson
George Grant (disambiguation)